William Foster may refer to:

People

Arts
Will Foster (fl. 1990–), keyboardist for English rock band The Tears
William C. Foster (1880–1923), pioneer of cinematography
William D. Foster (1884–?), African American film producer
William Gilbert Foster (1855–1906), British painter

Military
William Foster (British Army officer) (1881–1942), British Home Guard officer, awarded the George Cross, 1942
William Foster (Medal of Honor) (1832–1880), American soldier and Medal of Honor recipient
William A. Foster (1917–1945), United States Marine, Medal of Honor recipient, killed in action during World War II
William Foster MacNeece Foster, Royal Air Force officer

Politics
William Foster (New South Wales politician, born 1865) (1865–1936), member of NSW Legislative Assembly (1925–1936)
William Foster (New South Wales politician, born 1794)  (1793/4–1866), member of the NSW Legislative Council (1843–1845)
William John Foster (1831–1909), member of the NSW Legislative Council & Legislative Council, Attorney-General and Supreme Court judge
William Foster (New York state senator) (1813–1893), New York politician
William Foster (British politician) (1887–1947), British Labour Party MP for Wigan, 1942–1947
William Henry Foster (Lancaster MP) (1848–1908), MP for Lancaster 1895–1900
William Henry Foster (Bridgnorth MP) (1846–1924), British Member of Parliament (MP) for Bridgnorth 1870–1885
William Orme Foster (1814–1899), British Whig MP for South Staffordshire, 1857–1868
William W. Foster (1922–2000), Pennsylvania politician
William Z. Foster (1881–1961), Chairman of the Communist Party USA

Religion
William Foster (bishop) (1744–1797), Irish bishop
William Foster (divine) (born 1591), English divine

Sport
William Foster (English cricketer) (1859–1944), English cricketer
William Foster (Scottish cricketer) (born 1934), Scottish cricketer
William Foster (swimmer) (1890–1963), British Olympic freestyle swimmer
William Foster (footballer), English footballer

Other
William Foster (historiographer) (1863–1951), British historiographer and Superintendent of Records at the India office
William Foster (Iowa architect) (1842–1909), architect in Iowa, United States
William Chapman Foster (1897–1984), American businessman and government official
William Dewey Foster (1890–1958), American architect, designer of post offices and government buildings
William H. Foster (1847–1886), British-born American labor union leader
William P. Foster (1919–2010), creator of the Florida A&M University Marching 100 marching band
William P. Foster (jurist), American jurist from Virginia
William Trufant Foster (1879–1950), United States educator and economist, first president of Reed College
William Wasbrough Foster (1875–1954), Canadian mountaineer, politician, business man, and chief constable
William Foster (British architect) (1876–1940), British architect
William Alexander Foster (1840–1888), Canadian barrister and essayist
William Barclay Foster (1779–1855), father of Stephen Foster and businessman
William E. Foster (1851–1930), American librarian and author
William Foster, captain of the Clotilda and last person to have imported slaves from Africa to the United States

Organizations 
William Foster & Co. Ltd, an agricultural machinery company, which built the first tanks (armored vehicles)
William Foster Elementary School in Garfield Heights, Ohio named for William A. Foster, US. Marine

Fiction 
William Foster, a character portrayed by Michael Douglas in the 1993 movie Falling Down
William Foster, a character portrayed by Keanu Reeves in the 2018 movie Replicas

See also
Bill Foster (disambiguation)
William Forster (disambiguation)